San Martín is a department and region in northern Peru. Most of the department is located in the upper part of the Peruvian Amazon rainforest. Its capital is Moyobamba and the largest city in the department is Tarapoto.

Geography

Boundaries
 North and East: Loreto Region
 South: Huánuco Region
 West: La Libertad and Amazonas regions

Morphology

The territory of San Martín can be divided into four morphological zones: 
 the west, near the eastern side of the Andean Plateau, with a rough topography and many ravines;
 the zone of the wide valleys, with stepped terraces formed by the Huallaga River and its affluents, where population is engaged mainly in cattle and agriculture;
 the southwest zone, with a relief coming down from the Cordillera Azul, with low elevation, where is an impressive canyon known as Cajón de Sión, which finishes in the Cayumba rapids;
 a small lower jungle zone with areas easily flooded and with almost no accidents.

The Huallaga River is one of the most important rivers in the region. It forms, together with its tributaries a hydrographical system which drains all of the region's territory. The Pongo de Aguirre is an important canyon formed by the Huallaga going through the Andean hills.

History

Tupac Yupanqui entered and subdued the Inca dominion, the province of Moyobamba, known back then by its native name, Muyupampa. In 1539, Spaniard Alonso de Alvarado reached the Mayo River and founded a city he named Santiago de los Valles de Moyobamba, which later became the capital of Maynas. Another important personality was Priest Manuel Sobreviela who, between 1787 and 1790, accomplished traveling across the Huallaga River and subsequently published a map named "Planning for the course of the Huallaga and Ucayali Rivers and for the Pampa del Sacramento".

On August 19, 1821, Moyobamba was the first Peruvian city in declaring its independence.

The construction of a highway in recent years has increased the exchange of different products, benefitting the economy of this region.

Political division

The region is divided into 10 provinces, which are composed of 78 districts (distritos, singular: distrito).

The provinces, with their capitals in parenthesis, are:
 Bellavista (Bellavista)
 El Dorado (San José de Sisa)
 Huallaga (Saposoa)
 Lamas (Lamas)
 Mariscal Cáceres (Juanjuí)
 Moyobamba (Moyobamba)
 Picota (Picota)
 Rioja (Rioja)
 San Martín (Tarapoto)
 Tocache (Tocache)

Archaeology

Gran Pajáten is a pre Inca complex of circular slate buildings decorated with figures of flying condors situated on the border with La Libertad. Due to its difficult access, tourism is not yet possible at the site.

See also 
 Rio Abiseo National Park
Regional Museum of the National University of San Martin (Museo Regional de la Universidad Nacional de San Martín)

External links

  Gobierno Regional San Martín – San Martín Regional Government official website
  Proyecto Mono Tocon – Conservation and study programme for the threatened and endemic titi monkey of San Martin (Callicebus oenanthe). El Tití de San Martín (Callicebus oenanthe), localmente conocido como Mono Tocón, es una de las especies de primates más amenazadas del Perú, recientemente considerada por la UICN como en peligro de extinción.

 
Regions of Peru